DeMolay International is an international fraternal organization for young men ages 12 to 21. It was founded in Kansas City, Missouri, in 1919 and named for Jacques de Molay, the last Grand Master of the Knights Templar. DeMolay was incorporated in the 1990s and is classified by the IRS as a tax-exempt 501(c)(3) organization.

DeMolay is open for membership to young men between the ages of 12 and 21 who acknowledge a higher spiritual power. It has about 12,000 active members spread throughout every continent except for Antarctica. There are active chapters in Canada, Germany, Australia, Japan, Philippines, Argentina, Aruba, French Guiana, Uruguay, Paraguay, Peru, Bolivia, Brazil, Ecuador (affiliated to Peru jurisdiction), Italy, Romania, Greece (affiliated to Romania jurisdiction), France, Albania, Montenegro, Serbia, Bosnia (affiliated to Serbia jurisdiction), Bulgaria and the United States.

Although young women are not permitted to join DeMolay, chapters are permitted to elect chapter "sweethearts" and "princesses."

DeMolay is part of the "family" of Masons and associated organizations. DeMolay is the youth group for young men. (Rainbow Girls and Job's Daughters are similar Masonic-related organizations for young women.)

Founding 
The Order of DeMolay was founded in 1919 with nine members, most of whom lived near each other in Kansas City.

The crown appearing in the self-adopted heraldic arms (the emblem) of the order contains 10 rubies, each representing one of the original nine members and the organization's founder, Frank S. Land. Frank S. Land was a member of Ivanhoe Lodge No. 446. The rubies were originally portrayed as pearls; as each founding member died, the pearl representing him was changed to a ruby.

Values 
DeMolay has seven Cardinal Virtues, taught as its basic ideals.  The Order calls for every member to live according to these Virtues, which are considered as the things that distinguish a good leader and a good man.  They are:

Filial love (the love between a child and their parent): the love and the kindness we should have with our parents, the ones that gave us birth and taught us the first lessons of kindness, respect and belief in God. 
Reverence for sacred things: a belief in a supreme being (independent of a specific religion) and respect for others’ beliefs. 
Courtesy: kindness, respect, and philanthropy (which is only valid when it is done with heart and soul)
Comradeship: being a faithful friend, not only in good times but also in hard times.
Fidelity: the strength to follow one's own values and virtues, and to keep secret everything which is entrusted to one; faithfulness to God, one's homeland, and one's friends, as Jacques DeMolay preferred to die rather than betray his companions or break with his pledge.
Cleanliness:  purity in soul and heart, and a clear conscience, keeping your mind away from everything that is against the values of a good citizen. 
Patriotism: respect for, and the willingness to defend, our homeland, our democracy, our state and our city, including the preservation of public spaces and places, such as schools, asylums, orphanages and hospitals, that support people in need.

DeMolay defends three fundamental freedoms:

 Religious Freedom: represented by any holy book, independent of the religion, e.g. Bible, Quran, Torah, etc
 Civil Freedom: represented by the national flag
 Intellectual Freedom: represented by the Scholar Books

DeMolay has an Ethical Code, composed of the following statements:

 A DeMolay serves God.
 A DeMolay honors all womanhood.
 A DeMolay loves and honors his parents.
 A DeMolay is honest.
 A DeMolay is loyal to ideals and friends.
 A DeMolay practices honest toil.
 A DeMolay's word is as good as his bond.
 A DeMolay is courteous.
 A DeMolay is at all times a gentleman.
 A DeMolay is a patriot in peace as well as war.
 A DeMolay is clean in mind and body.
 A DeMolay stands unswervingly for the public schools.
 A DeMolay always bears the reputation of a good and law-abiding citizen.
 A DeMolay by precept and example must preserve the high standards to which he has pledged himself.

Organizational structure 
A local DeMolay body is known as a Chapter and is headed by the Master Councilor. The Master Councilor is elected by members of his Chapter and is usually among the older members of the group. The Master Councilor is assisted in his duties by a Senior Councilor and a Junior Councilor. The Senior Councilor is usually considered to be next in line as Master Councilor and Junior Councilor to follow, though two people can run against each other. The remaining officers of a Chapter are appointed by the Master Councilor, except for the Scribe, who is appointed by the Chapter's Advisory Council.

Adult men mentor and supervise the Chapter. These men, sometimes called "Dads," are often Masons or Senior DeMolays (former active members who have reached the age of 21) but can also be other men in the community, including the fathers of active members. In recent years, women have also served as advisors  for the group.

In addition to the individual Chapter, DeMolay has an officer structure at the state, provincial, or other large regional level led by a State Master Councilor, Provincial Master Councilor, or Jurisdictional Master Councilor. In some countries, DeMolay may have a national level organization headed by a "National Master Councilor". There are also other state, provincial, or jurisdictional positions, based on the officers of a chapter, which vary for each jurisdiction. The lead advisor (always a Master Mason and a member of the Supreme Council) in a state, jurisdiction, or country, is called an Executive Officer. The lead advisor internationally is known as a Grand Master, who governs the International Supreme Council. There are also Active DeMolay officers at an international level; the International Master Councilor and  International Congress Secretary  are the heads of the International DeMolay Congress. These officers are always past Jurisdictional Master Councilors.

In some countries other than the United States, the International Supreme Council of DeMolay has ceded control to an independent Supreme Council created to govern DeMolay in that country. Such a Supreme Council has its own Grand Master and officers. (Examples are Australia, Canada, Brazil, and the Philippines.)

Female youth leaders
Some DeMolay Chapters elect young women to positions of leadership, who act to support members and their activities. These positions are not officially recognized by DeMolay International; they are approved subject to the authority of the executive officer in the jurisdiction.

Sweetheart 
DeMolay Chapters may elect a "Chapter Sweetheart" to serve as the female representative of the Chapter, although she is not an initiated member of DeMolay. Her duties may include attending Chapter functions and acting as an ambassador of DeMolay. The "Sweetheart" must meet the age requirements of a particular jurisdiction or Chapter (often 14 to 21.) She may be a member of a neighboring Job's Daughters Bethel, Rainbow Assembly, or Triangle, but that is not a set requirement in most Jurisdictions.

Chapter Princess 
A Chapter may also elect a Chapter Princess. The program generally uses the same requirements as set forth for the Sweetheart. Her duties generally include attending Chapter functions and acting as an ambassador of DeMolay while assisting the Sweetheart in her duties.

Chapter Duchess 
A Chapter may also elect two Chapter Duchesses. The program generally uses the same requirements set forth for the Sweetheart. Her duties generally include attending Chapter functions and acting as an ambassador of DeMolay while assisting both the Sweetheart and Princess in their duties.

Chapter Little Sis 
A Chapter may also elect other females, who may or may not be a member of Job's Daughters International or International Order of Rainbow for Girls, to be a Little Sis. A Little Sis is usually 14–16 years old. She generally assists both the Princess and the Sweetheart in their duties.

Jurisdictional officers
Each state or jurisdiction holds an annual (or biennial, in some) event known as a Conclave or Convention. At this event, the members of the state or jurisdiction may vote on the State Master Councilor (or, in some cases the Provincial Master Councilor / Jurisdictional Master Councilor) and other elected positions. Some jurisdictions may elect a Deputy State Master Councilor, Sweetheart, and / or various other positions. In same cases, these officers are appointed by the executive officer of jurisdiction.  Some jurisdictions may hold a specific event, called Congress, separate and apart from Conclave or Convention to elect their jurisdictional officers and vote on any changes to the jurisdictional by-laws, then install the new officers at their Conclave or Convention.

Jurisdictional/State Officers are the leaders of their state/jurisdiction. They plan, lead, and execute all of the events happening in their state. They also serve as a resource for the DeMolays in their state to help them with events, ceremonies, and any other DeMolay related activities.

International leadership
The International Supreme Council is the governing body of DeMolay International.  It is composed of dedicated adult leaders from around the world who are responsible for the growth and success of DeMolay. The Grand Master, the Grand Senior Councilor, the Grand Junior Councilor, the Grand Secretary, and the Grand Treasurer are the elected leaders of the International Supreme Council. In certain parts of the world, such as Brazil, for example, DeMolay International has created daughter Supreme Councils and has ceded local control of DeMolay in those regions to the local Supreme Council.

Officers of DeMolay International
 

The DeMolay Congress is the Senate-style body where two voting delegates represent each DeMolay jurisdiction. The delegates meet once a year and elect an International Master Councilor and an International Congress Secretary, who lead and serve as the heads of the body for a time span of one year. Two Active DeMolays, usually the International Master Councilor and International Congress Secretary, are elected as voting members of the Board of Directors annually. Additionally, delegates discuss and vote on legislative issues.

International Congress Officers

Adult supervision 
Each chapter must be sponsored by a local Masonic body or some other group composed exclusively of Masons. The sponsoring body is responsible for providing the chapter with adult advisors and a place to meet. Members of the sponsoring body form the chapter's initial "advisory council". The advisory council selects one of its members to be its chairman, and he is the official liaison between the chapter and the sponsoring body. Another member of the advisory council is designated the "chapter advisor," and he is the official liaison between the advisory council and the chapter. The chapter's advisory council is responsible for supervising the chapter and its activities.

Activities
 
DeMolays participate in a wide range of social and sports activities that may include:  camping, holding dances with members of Rainbow and Job's Daughters, playing basketball, football, baseball, soccer, tennis, paintball, or billiards, going canoeing and kayaking, and taking long distance trips. Both Chapters and individual DeMolays participate in competitions for the best performance of the various Ceremonies of the Order. Winners of local competitions, in ritual and sports, may compete for State Championships, and sometimes State winners compete at higher levels. The Chapter collectively decides what events they enjoy, plans them, and in many cases holds fund raisers to finance those events.

DeMolay International Hall of Fame
DeMolay alumni have gone on to achieve wide recognition outside of the organization. Some have been elected to the DeMolay Hall of Fame. 
Not all DeMolays who have received recognition have been inducted into the Hall of Fame; some can be found on other lists.

The following is a partial list of the members of the DeMolay Hall of Fame. The full list is available on the DeMolay International Web site.

References

External links 

 DeMolay International's website
 Young Men on the Go (1960s), Internet Archive

Masonic youth organizations
Youth organizations established in 1919
1919 establishments in Missouri
Charities based in Missouri
Youth organizations based in Missouri
Service organizations